The men's 1500 metres at the 2005 World Championships in Athletics was held on August 6, 8 and 10 at the Helsinki Olympic Stadium.

With the retirement of defending champion, reigning Olympic Champion and World record holder Hicham El Guerrouj and Olympic silver medalist Bernard Lagat involved in citizenship issues as he moved to the United States, the role of favorite opened up to another Moroccan, Rashid Ramzi who had transplanted his citizenship to Bahrain while continuing to train in Morocco.  Returning silver medalist Mehdi Baala didn't make it out of the semi-final round.

The race was led from the start, as it had been two years earlier, by Reyes Estévez who was known as a kicker, leading the field though a casual 60+ second first lap. Alan Webb marked Estévez, nervously trying to figure out a way to take the kick out of the faster runners.  Rams added to his tension by coasting up to Webb's shoulder as the second lap began with the rest of the field bunching up behind.  Just after the end of the second lap, Webb took off sprinting, timed in 12.3 between 800 and 900 meters.  He opened up a four mere lead but Alex Kipchirchir and Ramzi followed by the rest of the field were in hot pursuit.  Webb was unable to maintain his breakaway.  In the penultimate turn he was passed by Ramzi who did have a breakaway, chased most closely by returning bronze medalist Ivan Heshko.  Down the final backstretch Kipchirchir went by on the outside and Olympic bronze medalist Rui Silva squeezed by on the inside, Webb was cooked.  From 9th place, deep in the field, Adil Kaouch began a final sprint, passing three as the slowing Webb was an obstacle.  Continuing through the final turn, Kaouch passed everybody except Ramzi.  Down the final stretch Ramzi's lead looked like it might not be enough but Ramzi was able to hold on for the win.  Following Kaouch, Silva was also sprinting, after passing Heshko the medalists were decided.  As Kaouch's gaining diminished he continued at his same pace, but Silva finished with an all out rush to the line missing the silver medal by a mere .02 of a second.

Lagat would return to competition to beat Ramzi to silver in 2007.  But Ramzi took the Olympic gold medal in 2008.  That gold was short-lived as Ramzi was disqualified for having CERA in his system.  While Ramzi's World Championship medals have not been disqualified, the Olympic disqualification puts a taint on Ramzi's accomplishments.

Medalists

Results
All times shown are in seconds.

Heats
August 6, 2005

Heat 1
 Mehdi Baala 3:36.56 Q
 Tarek Boukensa 3:36.70 Q
 Alex Kipchirchir 3:36.74 Q
 Kevin Sullivan 3:36.80 Q
 Michael East 3:36.84 Q
 Alan Webb 3:36.84 q
 Yassine Bensghir 3:37.11 q
 Juan Carlos Higuero 3:37.40 q
 Joeri Jansen 3:39.43 q
 Adrian Blincoe 3:39.54 q
 Jonas Hamm 3:43.20
 Ahmed Mohamed Abdillahi 3:50.92 (PB)
 Fumikazu Kobayashi 3:51.76
 Peter Roko Ashak DNS

Heat 2
 Arturo Casado 3:41.64 Q
 Adil Kaouch 3:41.75 Q (SB)
 Christopher Lukezic 3:41.80 Q
 Rui Silva 3:41.83 Q
 Daham Najim Bashir 3:41.88 Q
 Daniel Kipchirchir Komen 3:41.91
 Mounir Yemmouni 3:42.39
 Antar Zerguelaine 3:43.02
 Belal Mansoor Ali 3:43.15
 Hudson de Souza 3:43.18
 Nick McCormick 3:44.40
 Mulugeta Wendimu 3:44.42
 Samwel Mwera DNS
 Alin Soares DNS

Heat 3
 Rashid Ramzi 3:38.32 Q
 Ivan Heshko 3:39.84 Q
 Nicholas Willis 3:39.89 Q
 Reyes Estévez 3:39.93 Q
 Markos Geneti 3:39.94 Q
 Youssef Baba 3:39.96 q
 Rob Myers 3:40.16 q
 Nathan Brannen 3:40.69 q
 Johan Cronje 3:41.43 q
 Augustine Kiprono Choge 3:41.70
 James Nolan 3:42.53
 Armen Asyran 4:03.21
 Kamal Boulahfane DNS

Semifinals
August 8, 2005

Heat 1
 Adil Kaouch 3:40.51 Q (SB)
 Arturo Casado 3:40.61 Q
 Alex Kipchirchir 3:40.68 Q
 Rui Silva 3:40.72 Q
 Reyes Estévez 3:40.73 Q
 Nicholas Willis 3:40.87
 Kevin Sullivan 3:41.00
 Mehdi Baala 3:41.34
 Youssef Baba 3:42.12
 Rob Myers 3:42.38
 Johan Cronje 3:42.77
 Markos Geneti 3:42.80

Heat 2
 Rashid Ramzi 3:34.69 Q
 Alan Webb 3:36.07 Q
 Tarek Boukensa 3:36.14 Q
 Daham Najim Bashir 3:36.38 Q
 Ivan Heshko 3:36.60 Q
 Juan Carlos Higuero 3:36.65 q
 Yassine Bensghir 3:36.76 q
 Christopher Lukezic 3:37.20
 Adrian Blincoe 3:38.20
 Nathan Brannen 3:39.37
 Michael East 3:40.27
 Joeri Jansen 3:44.88

Final
August 10, 2005

 Rashid Ramzi 3:37.88
 Adil Kaouch 3:38.00 (SB)
 Rui Silva 3:38.02
 Ivan Heshko 3:38.71
 Arturo Casado 3:39.45
 Juan Carlos Higuero 3:40.34
 Alex Kipchirchir 3:40.43
 Tarek Boukensa 3:41.01
 Alan Webb 3:41.04
 Daham Najim Bashir 3:43.48
 Reyes Estévez 3:46.65
 Yassine Bensghir 3:50.19

External links
Official results - IAAF.org

1500 metres
1500 metres at the World Athletics Championships